Acanthonyx is a genus of crabs, in the family Epialtidae. Species so far known include:

 Acanthonyx consobrinus A. Milne-Edwards, 1862
 Acanthonyx dentatus H. Milne-Edwards, 1834
 Acanthonyx depressifrons Manning & Holthuis, 1981
 Acanthonyx dissimulatus Coelho, 1993
 Acanthonyx elongatus Miers, 1877
 Acanthonyx euryseroche Griffin & Tranter, 1986
 Acanthonyx formosa Wu, Yu & Ng, 1999
 Acanthonyx inglei Tirmizi & Kazmi, 1988
 Acanthonyx limbatus A. Milne-Edwards, 1862
 Acanthonyx lunulatus (Risso, 1816) 
 Acanthonyx minor Manning & Holthuis, 1981
 ?Acanthonyx nodulosa (Dana, 1852)
 Acanthonyx petiverii H. Milne-Edwards, 1834
 Acanthonyx quadridentatus Krauss, 1843
 Acanthonyx sanctaehelenae Chace, 1966
 Acanthonyx scutellatus MacLeay, 1838
 Acanthonyx scutiformis (Dana, 1851)
 Acanthonyx undulatus Barnard, 1947

References

Majoidea